The Directorate General of Forces Intelligence, commonly known as DGFI, is the military intelligence agency of the Bangladesh Armed Forces, tasked with collection, collation and evaluation of strategic and topographic information, primarily through human intelligence (HUMINT). As one of the principal members of the Bangladesh intelligence community, the DGFI reports to the Director-General and is primarily focused on providing intelligence for the Prime Minister, the Cabinet of Bangladesh, and the Armed Forces of Bangladesh.

Formed in 1972 as Directorate of Forces Intelligence, was organised as the principal intelligence arm of the military limited to gathering intelligence pertaining to the Armed Forces. The agency experienced dramatic growth after reorganization in 1977, and transformed into the principal intelligence arm of the military specializing in gathering of foreign military intelligence. The agency officially adopted its current name in the same year. The DGFI officially consists primarily of military officers from the three service branches of the Bangladesh Armed Forces, while with an evolving role in the country's intelligence community, DGFI is also reported to have classified civilian employees. The stated priority mission of the DGFI is to provide timely, and accurate intelligence, and tactical support to Bangladesh Armed Forces commands. DGFI is regarded as one of the primary instruments of Bangladesh's national power. While the budget of DGFI is classified, it is reported to have the largest budget of the intelligence agencies.

The DGFI has increasingly expanded its role throughout the years, including foreign intelligence gathering, counter-intelligence, covert operations, counter-proliferation, signals intelligence, cyber intelligence, and anti-terrorism. The agency's elite counter-terrorism unit formed in 2006, CTIB, is responsible for gathering intelligence, infiltrating and neutralizing terrorist organizations that may pose a threat to national security.

History
The DGFI was originally formed as Directorate of Forces Intelligence (DFI) in 1972. A major impetus for the creation of the agency was to monitor unforeseen threats from neighboring and foreign armed forces, especially India and Pakistan. DFI was headquartered in Segunbagicha, Bailey Road, Dhaka. Upon its creation, the role of DFI was strictly limited to sharing intelligence it gathered with the armed forces. The nascent DFI achieved very little and was overshadowed by National Security Intelligence (NSI), Bangladesh's principal intelligence agency.

In May 2014, a New Monogram of the DGFI was unveiled at its Headquarter. The Lotus placed on the center of the monogram, The National Flower Lotus expressing the ethnicity of independent sovereign Bangladesh. The eight light emission around the lotus expressing Patriotism, Loyalty, Discipline, Concentration, Alertness, Prudence, and Efficiency of the activities of the agency. At the bottom "Bangladesh" there are two stars at each side and a total of four stars representing the four fundamental principles of the constitution of Bangladesh, Nationalism, Secularism, Socialism and Democracy.

Directorates
The DGFI is headed by a Director-General, who is traditionally a serving Major-General (Two-star general) in the Bangladesh Army. Seven Deputy Director-Generals report directly to the Director-General with each deputy heading their assigned wings respectively:
 Directorate of Operations (MI, AI, NI)
 Provide Bangladesh Armed Forces with foreign intelligence on other nations' armed forces.
 Directorate of Joint Intelligence
 Works with National Security Intelligence (NSI), Special Branch, Detective Branch and Rapid Action Battalion to gather detective and anti-state intelligence.
 Counter-Intelligence Bureau (CIB)
 Information classified.
 Counter Terrorism and Intelligence Bureau (CTIB)
 Elite covert intelligence unit of Directorate General of Forces Intelligence, tasked with combating terrorism, gathering intelligence on internal or external threat to Bangladesh and counter-attack.
 Bureau X
 Classified. Reported to be foreign intelligence and espionage unit consisting of highly-specialized spies. 
 Internal Affairs Bureau (IAB)
 Monitors national political and strategic affairs.
 External Affairs Bureau (EAB)
 Monitors international political and strategic affairs.
 Cyber Intelligence Bureau
 Provide national cyber security and monitor online platforms.
 Signals Intelligence Bureau (SIB)
 Monitors national telecommunication.
 Press and Public Media Bureau (PPMB)
 Monitors press/publications and media. Also acts as liaison to public.

Director-generals

Organizational structure
Twelve bureaus and nineteen detachments make up the primary structure of the organisation. The total manpower for DGFI is estimated to be around 12,000. The commanding post for DGFI is the DG followed by the DDG, director, senior additional director, additional director, deputy director and assistant director. Officers from armed forces posted here on deputation. Some civilian officer also works for DGFI recruited by Chief Administrative Officer, Ministry of Defence, Bangladesh.

Counter-terrorism Unit
Counter Terrorism and Intelligence Bureau (CTIB), is an elite counter terrorism intelligence unit of DGFI. The Bureau was established in 2006 from the counterterrorism wing of DGFI which was established in 2002. The bureau was established along with the Rapid Action Battalion (RAB), and the counter terrorism cell of National Security Intelligence (NSI). CTIB is responsible for collecting and analysing intelligence on internal threats and counterattacks. CTIB agents are recruited from the Armed Forces and are responsible for gathering intelligence and executing special operations.

Functions and activities
The DGFI and its activities are highly classified and confidential to both the mass media and civilians. The functions and priorities of DGFI have changed throughout the years and vary with the country's political situations and foreign affairs. The primary function of the DGFI is the collection of foreign military intelligence, however during recent times, the agency has extended its role to economic, political and foreign intelligence. DGFI maintains active collaborations with very few other secret services around the world.

Military Experts have termed the subcontinent as a beehive of intelligence and counterintelligence activity and labelled the DGFI, ISI, CIA, FSB, R&AW, MSS, Mossad, and MI6 as the big players in the Asian intelligence Scene.

Notable foreign operations 
DGFI, like any other intelligence agency, collects information through human espionage. They have conducted numerous operations over the course of decades.

India 
 A Bangladeshi DGFI agent concealed his nationality and joined R&AW where he was known as Diwan Chand Mallik. He was known to have obtained important intelligence which was damaging for India's national security. He joined the agency in 1999 and used to live in East Delhi. A case of cheating and forgery was filed against him at the Lodhi Colony police station on the basis of a complaint by a senior RAW official. No trace of him was found afterwards.
Over the years, DGFI has been accused several times of aiding Indian separatists from North-East and Kashmir. Indian government and media have accused Bangladesh of involvement in the 2002 attack on American cultural centre in Kolkata. They have also blamed DGFI and ISI for designing coordinated attacks on Assam, Tripura and Bihar.
 Indian leading newspaper; DNA, published a report in 2008 claiming the presence of around one hundred DGFI operatives in East India. The newspaper further claimed that the agency had set up groups across India consisting seven to ten people, each headed by DGFI's highly sophisticated Bureau X. According to intelligence branch of West Bengal police, around fifteen Bureau X agents are active in West Bengal, each highly trained in handling sophisticated weapons and can effortlessly speak multiple languages and all the various dialects in the Indo-Bangladesh border districts.
According to Indian Intelligence analysis, Operation Pin Code was  launched by DGFI in 2004. The operation was intended to extend DGFI influence over West Bengal and Assam State Government. Several unreliable sources claimed that by 2008, DGFI successfully gained 70% control over West Bengal assembly. The agency was also blamed for rising terrorist threat in India, however, no evidence were presented by Indian agencies.
Although, some Indian politicians and the news media made a number of allegations and conspiracy theories against the DGFI. There were some positive roles for which they were also praised by the Indian government officials. One of the most significant recent accomplishments was DGFI's direct role in preventing a terror attack in Kolkata scheduled to coincide with India's April - May elections. The DGFI has carried out a number of successful operations targeting Lashkar-e-Taiba and other individuals associated with transnational terrorist organization on a priority basis as it poses a security risk not only for India's national security but also for Bangladesh. Indian government officials have praised DGFI for their successful operation which led to the arrest of three cell members involved in planning the attack.
On 7 April 2020 one of the assassins of Sheikh Mujibur Rahman, Captain (Rtd.) Abdul Majed was arrested by Counter Terrorism and Transnational Crime Unit of Bangladesh Police. According to Kolkata Police he was seen being followed by 4 well-built men on 22 February in the CCTV footage. With the help of cellphone location tracking, police guessed that Majed was taken to Howrah from Malda, West Bengal. Then he was taken to Guwahati from Shillong and made to cross the Dawki border illegally to enter Bangladesh. According to CBI it was probably a covert operation of DGFI.

Nepal 
 According to several sources, Bureau 3 of the DGFI is tasked with handling affairs in Nepal, Sri Lanka and Bhutan.
 Several Indian news outlets claimed to have found the trace of DGFI involvement in 2008 Assam bombings. According to reports, The blueprint was created at a three-day conclave held at Dhulikhel, 30 km north of Kathmandu, between 15 and 17 October. The sources said Colonel Ahmed Sufi of DGFI constructed a detailed blueprint for targeting the north eastern Indian states. The ISI was represented at the meet by a lieutenant general-level official responsible for overseeing affairs in South Asia. The ISI official took a circuitous route from Pakistan to Dubai to Dhaka before reaching Kathmandu via Biman Bangladesh airlines in order to avoid any suspicion by Indian security agencies, the sources revealed.
 In 2014, DGFI tracked down Indian Mujahideen's top commander, Zia Ur Rehman in Nepal. The operation was executed after formal request from India's R&AW and Nepal's law enforcement agencies.

United Kingdom
 According to several leading British newspapers, United Kingdom's Home Secretary Jacqui Smith, several high-level MI5 and MI6 officials flew to Dhaka for meeting with senior officials of Directorate General of Forces Intelligence. She urged that DGFI investigate a number of British nationals whom the British security agencies found to be suspicious. As a result, A number of British suspects were taken to DGFI's secret interrogation centre, known as the Task Force for Interrogation cell (TFI). The British High Commission, Dhaka has rejected the allegations, stating that our security cooperation with other countries is consistent with our laws and with our values. High Commissioner Stephen Evans acknowledged that British and Bangladeshi intelligence agencies cooperated in certain areas, which includes sharing of information which may be relevant to the security of either country.

Allegations
 In 2008, Tasneem Khalil, a CNN news representative accused DGFI of arresting, and torturing him for twenty-two hours for criticizing the military for using the interim government as a cover for de facto army rule. Though Khalil is a controversial journalist and according to most of the influential journalists of Bangladesh, Khalil's allegations are questionable in terms of its credibility.   Human Rights Watch published a report and supporting evidence to show Bangladeshi activist Tasneem Khalil was tortured at detention cell controlled by Bangladesh Director General of Forces Intelligence (DGFI).
 In 2008, several leading Indian newspaper accused DGFI of operating in north-east India. Several Indian politicians accused DGFI of backing ULFA with training and financing. No evidences were found to establish the allegations. Journalist Bertil Lintner's book "Great Game East", recounts his meeting with ULFA military wing chief Paresh Barua in a DGFI safehouse in Dhaka on 29 April 1996.
 In 2009, in the  aftermath of Bangladesh Rifles revolt, security forces of Bangladesh detained more than 6,000 Bangladesh Rifles (BDR) members. At least 47 detained BDR members reportedly died in custody. DGFI was accused of torturing them to death. DGFI allegedly ran torture cells in many rooms of its headquarters building located in Kachukhet, Dhaka Cantonment.
 In 2011, British newspaper The Guardian accused DGFI of torturing several British citizens in an unknown torture cell. Among the alleged victims, Jamil Rahman, a British national accused DGFI of repeatedly torturing him for over two years. He also accused British intelligence unit MI5 of working with DGFI. No evidences were found to support the allegations.
 In 2015, DGFI was accused of blocking major companies from advertising in two major newspapers in Bangladesh; the daily Prothom Alo and the Daily Star, causing a loss of $2 million during the first month. Telenor, which owns a 55% stake in Grameenphone admitted that top-level officers from DGFI forced them to stop advertising in these two newspapers. However, other large corporations refused to comment on the issue. "We were informed by our clients that due to unavoidable circumstances, we should stop all advertisements in Prothom Alo and the Daily Star," Alam said. "We initially continued to advertise in the magazine supplements, but that was also stopped."
 In 2018, Bangladesh's Chief Justice Surendra Kumar Sinha accused DGFI of forcing him to resign by threatening 'serious consequences' if he refuse to do so. In a controversial book "A Broken Dream: Rule of Law, Human Rights & Democracy", he describes DGFI treatment as so cruel that it could be compared with none other than the Gestapo force of Hitler. Sinha's allegations are refuted by several high level legal officers, including the attorney general Mahbubey Alam, who said, Justice SK Sinha has written the book basing on his wild imagination, not on facts. There is no need to take this book seriously.

 In 2020, an investigative report by Al Jazeera accused DGFI of purchasing Israeli-made mass surveillance equipment. The report claims of classified meeting between a team of DGFI officers and Mossad operatives in Hungary. Bangladesh has no diplomatic relations with Israel and trade with Israel is prohibited. Bangladesh Army denied these allegations in an official statement.
 In 2022, German broadcaster DW reported that Bangladesh Director General of Forces Intelligence (DGFI) operates illegal secret detention and torture cells in the capital city Dhaka, Bangladesh. The government of Bangladesh didn’t publish an exact number of detainees. Still, the photograph revealed by the voice of America and DW Bangla news shows numerous solitary confinement cells in an unknown location in Dhaka. It was reported that detainees were from the opposition party Bangladesh Nationalist Party (BNP), and ordinary citizens who criticised the current Awami League-led government of Bangladesh. According to the report, the Dhaka cantonment is one of the places where detainees were kept blindfolded.

See also
 2004 arms and ammunition haul in Chittagong
 National Committee for Intelligence Coordination
 National Security Intelligence

References

Further reading

 Bangladesh Country Study Guide: Vol I
 Ignoring Executions and Torture: Impunity for Bangladesh's Security Forces
 Pakistan Intelligence, Security Activities and Operations Handbook
 India's Fragile Borderlands: The Dynamics of Terrorism in North East India

Military intelligence agencies
Special forces of Bangladesh
Government agencies established in 1977
Information sensitivity
Bangladeshi intelligence agencies